Fry's Trading Post, near Bonners Ferry, Idaho, was built in 1876.  It has also been known as Bonner-Fry Trading Post.  It was listed on the National Register of Historic Places in 1983.

It was described in its NRHP nomination as a -story log building.

The facility was destroyed by fire.

References

Buildings and structures completed in 1876
National Register of Historic Places in Boundary County, Idaho
Log buildings and structures on the National Register of Historic Places in Idaho
1876 establishments in Washington Territory